Franz Schafranek OBE (6 February 1930 – 4 June 1991) was the founder of Vienna's English Theatre.

The theatre was, in retrospect, Franz Schafranek's destiny from the cradle on. The founder and director of Vienna’s English Theatre certainly grew into a total theatre person: a visionary and realist; philosopher and entrepreneur; an artist through and through.

His youthful ambition to study literature and theatre arts led him out of the gloomy confines of post-war Austria to Sweden. He graduated summa cum laude from the University of Stockholm, where he attracted the attention of Ingmar Bergman. After serving under the famed Swedish filmmaker as assistant director, Schafranek went on to Berlin. Here, he gained invaluable insights and experience working with Bertolt Brecht at his "Theater on the Schiffbauerdamm."

In 1963, having returned to Vienna after his years abroad, he embarked on a venture deemed incredible at the time. No one believed he could make a success of the English-speaking theatre he founded together with his American wife, Ruth Brinkmann. Yet, without public subsidies, relying only on his own vision and sure theatrical instincts, he achieved the seemingly impossible. In a city still mired in post-war provincialism, Franz Schafranek found a ready-made audience eager from the start to lend support and fill the seats of Vienna’s English Theatre.

Within a few years, Franz Schafranek’s confident vision, personal charisma and tireless leadership had made Vienna’s English Theatre into a permanent fixture in the city’s theatrical landscape. Ever searching out new possibilities, he gained wide recognition for his theatre and for the city of Vienna as a forward-looking centre of international theatre. He staged world premieres of works by renowned American playwrights, Tennessee Williams, William Saroyan and Edward Albee, as well as numerous continental premieres of British and American dramas. He also brought prominent stars of stage and screen to perform on his Josefsgasse stage.

Others might have been satisfied with such achievements, but Franz Schafranek was never one to rest on his laurels. In 1978 he founded the "Theatre Français de Vienne", and in 1985 the "Teatro Italiano di Vienna", exciting new interest with productions and star appearances from these countries.
Franz Schafranek placed the world on the small stage of Vienna’s English Theatre. He took his success with characteristic modesty and a sure sense of the possibilities open to him. These he carried to the utmost, earning numerous awards both at home and abroad in recognition of his contribution to the dramatic arts. His greatest reward was doubtless the steady increase and loyal patronage of his many subscribers. The theatre was his life, and his sudden death in the night following a much acclaimed premiere, while shocking, seemed appropriate in the Rilkian sense of, "Oh God! Give to each his own death."

Franz Schafranek had actually envisioned taking his final bow at such a moment of deep personal fulfillment and fate granted this wish. He has left the stage, yet his life work lives on in Vienna's English Theatre.

External links 
 Kurzbiografie, Website des Vienna's English Theatre
 

1930 births
1991 deaths
Austrian theatre directors
People from Nové Hrady